For the number system, see Base 24.
BASE24 is a series of applications produced by ACI Worldwide, Inc. that support payment systems used by large financial institutions.

BASE24-atm 
BASE24-atm is an EFT processing and switching system that provides ATM support and management including transaction routing and authorization, electronic data interchange, settlement, reporting,  network control, and stored-value card functionality.

BASE24-eps 
BASE24-eps, formerly BASE24-es, is a payment engine that the financial payments industry uses. It is used to acquire, authenticate, route, switch, and authorize financial transactions across multiple channels.  It is supported by mainframe computer platforms including z/OS, HP NonStop (Tandem), UNIX (IBM pSeries, Sun Sparc) and Linux (x86_64).

BASE24-infobase 
BASE24-infobase is used to collect ATM transactions, including EFT payments, and distribute operational data, such as automated software updates.  It operates on HP NonStop and is able to receive data from a range of ATMs.

BASE24-pos 
BASE24-pos is a data integrity support application.  It is supported by HP NonStop servers. It has a Stored Value Module component that provides online issuance and validation of stored-value card data.  It also has an ACI Commerce Gateway component which serves as a firewall between internal servers and the Internet or other payment networks.

References 

Payment systems